The Stroukoff YC-134, designed in 1956, was based heavily on the Fairchild C-123 Provider, itself designed by Michael Stroukoff. The United States military contracted with Stroukoff Aircraft Corporation to develop an improved version of the aircraft, combining features that the company had developed for the YC-123D and YC-123E.

History

Stroukoff's work with the C-123

In 1956, Stroukoff had already gained much experience working on the C-123 Provider, having completed two contracts based on that airframe.

Its YC-123D had introduced a Boundary Layer Control (BLC) system to the C-123B. This system forced pressurized air over the upper wing surfaces of the airplane, making the wing work as if it were flying at much greater airspeed. This greatly improved landing and take-off performance, gross weight capability, and lowered the C-123's stall speed.

The YC-123E had been another experiment in improving the C-123's ability to operate wherever it might need to, introducing Stroukoff's own Pantobase system: two high-stress skis fitted to the lower fuselage, wingtip mounted floats, along with sealing the fuselage itself. This gave the YC-123E the ability to operate on water, as well as ice and snow, and with the BLC from the previous YC-123D, the new aircraft could effectively be operated from almost any runway surface available, and airstrips of shorter length.

The YC-134
The product of a US Air Force contract in 1956, a single C-123B from the -CN production block (serial 52-1627) was modified by Stroukoff Aircraft to become the YC-134. This aircraft was heavily modified with the following new features:
New Engines: The YC-134 was equipped with two  Wright Turbo Compound R3350-89A radial engines, turning four-blade, thirteen foot Aeroproducts constant-speed fully feathering propellers.
Improved Control Surfaces: The YC-134's horizontal stabilizers were given endplates to improve directional stability. This gave the aircraft its distinctive three-tail look.
Improved landing gear: While the nosewheel from the C-123B was retained, both main gears were given a third wheel to improve weight distribution.
Fuel was no longer housed in the rear of the engine nacelles, but in an expanded center-wing fuel tank. In addition, two plumbed hardpoints for 550-gallon drop tanks were also added to each wing.
Stroukoff's BLC and Pantobase: the YC-134 was fitted with Stroukoff's own BLC and all three aircraft had they been delivered were to have been fitted with the Pantobase equipment designed for the YC-123E.

The U.S. Air Force, however, deemed that the YC-134 did not offer substantial improvement over the C-123, nor did it have a requirement for a piston-engined amphibious assault transport, and decided to purchase the Lockheed C-130 Hercules.

Specifications (YC-134A)

See also

References

 

YC-134
Stroukoff C-134
Amphibious aircraft
High-wing aircraft
Twin piston-engined tractor aircraft